Manggahan station is an under-construction Manila Metro Rail Transit (MRT) station situated on Line 7. The station will be located along Commonwealth Avenue in Commonwealth, Quezon City.

The station's previous working name is North Batasan since it is at the north end of the Batasan Road. Closest landmarks include the Commonwealth and Litex Public Market and the Commonwealth Elementary and High School.

, the project is 66.07% complete; the station's construction is to be finished by June of the same year.

References

External links
Proposed Manggahan MRT Station

Manila Metro Rail Transit System stations
Railway stations under construction in the Philippines